Cecil Weld-Forester, 1st Baron Forester (baptised 7 April 1767 – 23 May 1828) was a Tory British Member of Parliament and later peer.

Biography

Born Cecil Forester and baptised at St Chad's Church, Shrewsbury, he assumed the additional surname of Weld by Royal Licence in 1811, upon inheriting Willey Park from his cousin George Forester. He was educated at Westminster School and Christ Church, Oxford.

He was elected to the House of Commons for Wenlock in 1790, a seat he held until 1820. The latter year he was raised to the Peerage of the United Kingdom as Baron Forester, of Willey Park in the County of Shropshire. He had initially asked to be titled as Baron Wenlock to spite the rival local Lawley family who later did take the title.

During the time of the French Revolutionary Wars, Forester was in 1800 captain of the Wenlock volunteers troops, becoming ultimately lieutenant-colonel in command in 1804. In 1813 he served as treasurer of the Salop Infirmary in Shrewsbury.

Lord Forester married Lady Katherine Mary Manners, daughter of Charles Manners, 4th Duke of Rutland, and wife Lady Mary Somerset, in 1800. They had nine children, four sons and five daughters.

He died of gout at Belgrave Square, London in 1828, aged 61, and was buried at Willey parish church. His tomb was sculpted by John Carline.

He was succeeded in the barony by his eldest son John George Weld-Forester. Lady Forester died in 1829. His descendants would later be in the British line of succession to the throne through his descendant Princess Alice, Duchess of Gloucester, and Mary, Princess Royal and Countess of Harewood, the wife of his great-grandson, Henry Lascelles, 6th Earl of Harewood.

Of his five daughters, Lady Anne, who married George Stanhope, 6th Earl of Chesterfield, and Lady Selina, who married Orlando Bridgeman, 3rd Earl of Bradford, were leaders of fashionable society, and both were intimate friends of Benjamin Disraeli. It was often said that Disraeli in his last years was in love with Selina, but since she was not free to marry, he proposed to the widowed Lady Anne instead, in the hope of remaining close to both sisters. Anne refused his proposal on the grounds that they were both too old to start a new life.

Notes

References
 Kidd, Charles, Williamson, David (editors). Debrett's Peerage and Baronetage (1990 edition). New York: St Martin's Press, 1990 
 
 

1767 births
1828 deaths
Barons in the Peerage of the United Kingdom
Members of the Parliament of Great Britain for English constituencies
British MPs 1790–1796
British MPs 1796–1800
Members of the Parliament of the United Kingdom for English constituencies
UK MPs 1801–1802
UK MPs 1802–1806
UK MPs 1807–1812
UK MPs 1812–1818
UK MPs 1818–1820
UK MPs who were granted peerages
Peers of the United Kingdom created by George IV